United Nations General Assembly Resolution 1631 was adopted on October 27, 1961 to admit Mauritania to membership in the United Nations.

The resolution was adopted by a majority of 68 members with 13 opposing, 20 abstaining and Cyprus didn't vote.

Voting Results 
The result of the voting was the following:

References

1631
1961 in Mauritania
Mauritania and the United Nations